Dr James Mackay Shewan LLD  CBiol FIFST (1909–1988) was a 20th-century Scottish chemist, bacteriologist and amateur historian. He was Head of the Torry Research Station near Aberdeen.

Life
He was born on 6 December 1909 in Kirkhill, Invernessshire the son of the local schoolmaster, also James Mackay Shewan, and his wife, Jane Ridland. On the death of his father the family moved to Aberdeen. There he was educated at the Central Secondary School and won a scholarship to Aberdeen University where he studied Chemistry and Geology, graduating BSc in 1932. He then did postgraduate studies and received a doctorate (PhD).

In 1960 he was elected a Fellow of the Royal Society of Edinburgh. His proposers were George Adam Reay, David Cuthbertson, Vero Wynne-Edwards and Alexander Macdonald.

He died on 23 June 1988.

Publications

Marine Microbiology - Deep Sea (1963) - translation
The Estimation of Trimethylamine in Fish Muscle (1972)
The Deeside Field Club (1981)
Monumental Inscriptions in Monymusk Churchyard (1986)

References

1909 births
1988 deaths
Alumni of the University of Aberdeen
Scottish chemists
Fellows of the Royal Society of Edinburgh
Fellows of the Society of Antiquaries of Scotland
Scottish bacteriologists
20th-century antiquarians